Sayim Mustafa (born 28 October 1991) is an Indian cricketer. He made his Twenty20 debut for Jammu and Kashmir in the 2016–17 Inter State Twenty-20 Tournament on 31 January 2017.

References

External links
 

1991 births
Living people
Indian cricketers
Jammu and Kashmir cricketers
People from Srinagar